Patrick John Earles (born 22 March 1955 in Titchfield, Hampshire) is an English former footballer who played as a forward in the Football League for Southampton and Reading. He was a member of the Southampton squad which reached the 1976 FA Cup Final, and made over 250 appearances for Reading, scoring 85 goals, and helped the club win the Fourth Division title in 1979.
He then had a spell playing non-league football, with clubs including Road-Sea Southampton and Bognor Regis Town.

Earles went on to work as a probation officer for Hampshire Probation Service.

References

1955 births
Living people
People from Titchfield
English footballers
Association football forwards
Southampton F.C. players
Reading F.C. players
English Football League players